WCEO (840 AM, "La Raza") is a Regional Mexican radio station located in Columbia, South Carolina, United States. The station is licensed by the Federal Communications Commission (FCC) to broadcast during daytime hours only (sunrise to sunset) with a power of 50,000 watts.

History
840 AM originally signed on January 1, 1994, as WCTG with a Christian/Talk format using programming from USA Radio Network.  The format had failed to make a splash in the ratings and was adjusted to a secular Talk format. The station became WCEO in November 2000, but the Talk format continued. Eventually, Spanish-language programming was added on weekends under time broker agreements.

In late November 2004, WCEO briefly changed format to Adult Standards as "Sunny 840", acquiring the callsign WSCQ in the process (WSCQ was used on 100.1 in the Columbia market for many years before becoming WXBT in early 2004). However, this arrangement lasted less than a month before the station changed again to Spanish Contemporary as "La Tremenda", reclaiming the WCEO call letters in the process.

WCEO must leave the air from sunset to sunrise to protect clear-channel WHAS in Louisville, Kentucky.

The station is owned by Norsan Broadcasting WCEO, LLC.

References

External links
La Raza 840 Facebook

CEO
CEO
Regional Mexican radio stations in the United States
CEO